Shippagan is a Canadian town within Shippegan Parish, Gloucester County, New Brunswick.

The parish retains the original English spelling, while the town officially adopted the colloquial French spelling on 1 July 1981.

Shippagan was greatly enlarged on 1 January 2023, when it amalgamated with Le Goulet and all or part of seven local service districts Revised census figures have not been released.

Geography
Shippagan is located in the northeastern part of the Acadian Peninsula: a combination bridge-causeway connects the town with Lamèque Island to the northeast.

The peninsula is approximately 5 km (3 miles) long and at maximum 5 km (3 miles) wide, bordered on the north-west by Shippagan Bay, to the north by Shippagan harbour to the east by the Gulf of Saint Lawrence and to the west by St Simon's Bay.

Approximately 99% of the town's residents are Francophone.

History

The town was founded by the Duguay family, from Paspébiac, Quebec and the Robichaux family from Bonaventure, Quebec in 1790, as a result of expansion of the Charles Robin Company. Jean-Baptiste Robichaux was in 1798 the first settler from Grand Chipagan to petition the government for title to his land, in 1798; he was the son of an expelled Acadian.

The location of the town is an ideal spot for fishing, which was its first economic product, as well as exporting timber from further inland. There are also numerous peat bogs in the area, and their exploitation continues to this day.

Shippagan is home to campuses of the Université de Moncton and New Brunswick Community College.

In May 2021, Shippagan elected the first black mayor of any town in New Brunswick.

The name
The name originates from the Mi'kmaq Sepagun-chiche, which roughly translates as "Ducks' transit route".   This name described the immediate region rather than the specific location of the current settlement that inherited the name.

Different spellings have been applied over the years.   None of the earliest known francophone explorers such as Jacques Cartier, Samuel de Champlain and Nicolas Denys mentions the name Shippagan, which appears in writing for the first time only in 1656 when Ignatius of Paris, a Capucine missionary, wrote to his superiors recommending the establishment of four or five missionary posts, one of which he called "Cibaguensi", a Latinised form of Shippagan.

During the eighteenth century various orthographies were used for the nearby settlement on the site of what is now Bas-Caraquet, most commonly Chipagan, and this is the name subsequently applied and adapted for modern-day Shippagan.   Early English language texts applied the francophone spelling, "Chipagan", but from the early nineteenth centuries various anglophone variants were preferred, such as Shipagan, Ship-a-gang, Shipegan, Shippegan, Shippigan and Shippagan.   By the twenty-first century custom had settled on "Town of Shippagan" which on September 9, 2009, was officially reduced to "Shippagan".

Demographics

Language

Coat of Arms 
On August 15, 2019, the town was granted a coat of arms by the Canadian Heraldic Authority, while the announcement of the Letters Patent was made on March 28, 2020, in Volume 154, page 692 of the Canada Gazette.

Notable people

 Luc Bourdon - an NHL ice hockey defenseman who played with the Vancouver Canucks.

See also
List of communities in New Brunswick

Notes

References

External links 
Town of Shippagan

Communities in Gloucester County, New Brunswick
Towns in New Brunswick
Populated coastal places in Canada